This is a list of locations in which films of the James Bond series have been set and filmed (excepting only Never Say Never Again and Casino Royale (1967)).

Locations depicted in films
Locations are listed in order of appearance. Studio sets are not included.

 With You Only Live Twice and Licence to Kill being notable exceptions, James Bond is almost always seen at the HQ of MI6 (referred to as MI7 in Dr. No) in central London. This has been the actual headquarters of MI6: the Vauxhall Cross building on the Thames from GoldenEye (1995) onwards. Prior to that it was a nondescript building near Whitehall, sometimes (Dr. No, On Her Majesty's Secret Service, The Living Daylights) ostensibly the HQ of Universal Exports, the Secret Service's front company.

Shooting locations
This list shows which films were shot in which countries.

 Other places in England – For Your Eyes Only, Octopussy, GoldenEye, Die Another Day, Happy and Glorious (London, RAF Odiham, Church Crookham, Hampshire, The Eden Project, Cornwall, Epsom Downs Racecourse, London, Holywell Bay, Newquay, Cornwall, Ascot racecourse, London)
 France – Moonraker (Studios De Boulogne Paris Studios, Cinema Eclair Studios)
 Bahamas – subaquatic scenes in You Only Live Twice, The Spy Who Loved Me, For Your Eyes Only, The World Is Not Enough, Casino Royale (Nassau, Coral Harbour)

Landmarks 
A number of well-known international landmarks figure prominently in the film series.

See also
 Outline of James Bond

References

External links
 On the tracks of 007, a detailed listing of the many film locations used in the Bond films
 BritMovieTours.com: Movie Locations
 James Bond multimedia | James Bond locations

Film locations
James Bond
James Bond film locations
James Bond in film